Leslie Speed (3 October 1923 – 5 June 2012) was a Welsh professional footballer. He made over 200 appearances in the Football League with Wrexham

Career

Speed guested for Chelsea and Portsmouth during the Second World War.

After the war he signed for Wrexham, where he spent 10 years and made over 200 appearances for the club.

After leaving Wrexham, he went on appear for Stafford Rangers and Holywell Town as player-manager.

Death
Speed died on 5 June 2012 after suffering from Alzheimer's disease.

References

1923 births
2012 deaths
Llandudno F.C. players
Wrexham A.F.C. players
Stafford Rangers F.C. players
Holywell Town F.C. players
Chelsea F.C. wartime guest players
Portsmouth F.C. wartime guest players
Stafford Rangers F.C. managers
Welsh footballers
Association football fullbacks
Welsh football managers
Deaths from Alzheimer's disease